The 1946 Copa del Generalísimo was the 44th staging of the Copa del Rey, the Spanish football cup competition.

The competition began on April 7, 1946 and concluded on June 9, 1946 with the final.

During the game, Barcelona suffered an 8–0 defeat at the hands of Sevilla in the round of 16 first leg, conceding 8 goals in a single game for the last time until 2020, when they were thrashed by Bayern Munich in the Champions League quarter-final 2–8.

First round

|}
Tiebreaker

|}

Round of 16

|}
Tiebreaker

|}
Barcelona's lose to Sevilla was the final time they conceded 8 goals in the single match until they lose to Bayern Munich in 2019-20 UEFA Champions League quarter-final.

Quarter-finals

|}

Semi-finals

|}

Final

|}

External links
 rsssf.com
 linguasport.com

Copa del Rey seasons
1945–46 in Spanish football cups